DDX3X syndrome is a genetic disorder that affects predominantly females. Patients with DDX3X syndrome may develop developmental delay or intellectual disability, autism, ADHD, and low muscle tone. The syndrome develops due to mutations of the DDX3X gene located on the X chromosome, and the clinical picture varies depending on the specific mutation.

History  
The syndrome was first described in a study published in 2015.

Prevalence
According to studies performed up to 2022, DDX3X syndrome was presumed to account for 1-3% of cases of unexplained developmental delay and/or intellectual disability in females, but this may be an approximate early estimate.

Alternative names 
 X-linked mental retardation 102

Figures

External links
 Intellectual developmental disorder, X-linked, syndrome, Snijders Blok type - a record in OMIM

References

Genetic diseases and disorders
X-linked dominant disorders
X-linked recessive disorders